Nils Olof Stahre (19 April 1909 – 7 March 1988) was a Swedish Army officer and horse rider who competed in the 1948 and 1952 Summer Olympics.

In 1948 he and his horse Komet won a silver medal in the team eventing, after finishing fifteenth in the individual competition. Four years later they won a gold medal in the team eventing and finished eighth individually.

After the 1952 Games Stahre became a coach and led Petrus Kastenman to the 1956 Olympic gold medal.

Stahre became major in the reserve in 1955.

Awards and decorations
  Knight of the Order of the Sword (1954)

References

External links
profile

1909 births
1988 deaths
Swedish Army officers
Swedish event riders
Olympic equestrians of Sweden
Swedish male equestrians
Equestrians at the 1948 Summer Olympics
Equestrians at the 1952 Summer Olympics
Olympic gold medalists for Sweden
Olympic silver medalists for Sweden
Olympic medalists in equestrian
Medalists at the 1952 Summer Olympics
Medalists at the 1948 Summer Olympics
Knights of the Order of the Sword
People from Lerum Municipality
Sportspeople from Västra Götaland County